The Ballad of Uhlans (Уланская баллада) is a 2012 Russian historical adventure film directed by Oleg Fesenko, and stars Sergei Bezrukov, Anna Chipovskaya, Anton Sokolov and Vladimir Gostyukhin.

The Ballad of Uhlans was released on 1 November 2012 in Russia.

Plot
In 1812, on the eve of the decisive Battle of Borodino, a French secret agent steals a battle plan of the Russian troops. This fact is known to General Kutuzov, thanks to a young nobleman named Alexey Tarusov. Tarusov joins a regiment of Russian lancers, and finds new friends and together they have many adventures...

Cast
Sergei Bezrukov - (Go) Rzhevskiy
Anna Chipovskaya - Panna Beata 
 Anton Sokolov - Alexey Tarusov
Vladimir Gostyukhin - Turusov Sr.
 Anatoliy Beliy - Knyaz Kiknadze
 Stanislav Duzhkinov - Ptukha
 Valery Nikolaev - De Vitt
 Olga Kabo - Martha
 Sergei Juravel - Mikhail Kutuzov
 Boris Klyuyev - Arkacheev
 Eric Fratichelli - Napoleon
Dimitri Isayev - Alexander I
 Gedininas Adomaitis - Armand de Kolencour
 Paweł Deląg - Ledokhovskiy
 Alexei Makarov - Troitskiy
 Egor Pazenko - Uvarov
 Svetlana Metkina - Maria Valevskaya

Home Media
The Ballad of Uhlans was released on DVD and Blu-ray Disc in the Russian Federation in January 2013.

External links

information in Kino-Teatr.Ru

2012 films
2010s historical adventure films
2010s war adventure films
2010s Russian-language films
Films set in 1812
Russian historical adventure films
Russian war films
Films about the French invasion of Russia
2010s French-language films
Films set in Moscow
Films set in Warsaw
Films shot in Russia
Films shot in the Czech Republic
Russian spy films
Films about the Russian Empire